This is a list of episodes from the Duck Dodgers cartoon series. Each season contains 13 episodes. A total of 39 episodes were produced spanning 3 seasons.

Series overview

Episodes

Season 1 (2003)

Season 2 (2004–05)

Season 3 (2005)

External links

Lists of American children's animated television series episodes
Lists of Cartoon Network television series episodes
Duck Dodgers